(born December 17, 1969) is a Japanese actor known for playing the Rose Orphnoch in Kamen Rider 555.

Roles 
Kamen Rider 555 as Kyoji Murakami/Rose Orphnoch
Kamen Rider 555: Paradise Lost as Kyoji Murakami
Kamen Rider Blade: Missing Ace as Hanada
Garo as Yūji Mitsuki
Kamen Rider Kiva as Takeo Ōmura/Frog Fangire

References 

1969 births
Living people
Male actors from Kyoto Prefecture